SS F. Southall Farrar was a Liberty ship built in the United States during World War II. She was named after F. Southall Farrar, an agriculturist and 4-H leader from Virginia.

Construction
F. Southall Farrar was laid down on 22 May 1944, under a Maritime Commission (MARCOM) contract, MC hull 2365, by J.A. Jones Construction, Brunswick, Georgia; she was sponsored by Mrs. James A. Jones Jr., daughter-in-law of James Addison Jones, and launched on 4 July 1944.

History
She was allocated to the Union Sulphur Company, on 20 July 1944. On 28 June 1948, she was laid up in the National Defense Reserve Fleet in Beaumont, Texas. On 30 December 1965, she was sold, to Sampson Iron & Supply Co., for $51,505, to be scrapped. She was removed from the fleet on 17 January 1966.

References

Bibliography

 
 
 
 
 

 

Liberty ships
Ships built in Brunswick, Georgia
1944 ships
Beaumont Reserve Fleet